Mary DuBuisson is an American politician serving as a member of the Louisiana House of Representatives from the 90th district. She assumed office on December 19, 2018.

Career 
DuBuisson served as a legislative assistant in the office of State Representative Greg Cromer. She was elected to the Louisiana House of Representatives in December 2018, succeeding Cromer.

Personal life 
DuBuisson lives in Slidell, Louisiana.

References 

Living people
Republican Party members of the Louisiana House of Representatives
Women state legislators in Louisiana
People from Slidell, Louisiana
People from St. Tammany Parish, Louisiana
Year of birth missing (living people)